The 2019 Kuwait Emir Cup is the 57th edition, Kuwait SC are the defending champions.

Pots

Round 1

Pot A

Pot B

Quarter-finals

Semi-finals

Final

References

External links
Soccerway

Kuwait Emir Cup seasons
Kuwait Emir Cup
Emir Cup